Andrew Martin (born 12 May 1980) is an Australian athlete. He competed in the men's javelin throw at the 2000 Summer Olympics.

References

External links
 

1980 births
Living people
Athletes (track and field) at the 2000 Summer Olympics
Australian male javelin throwers
Olympic athletes of Australia
Athletes from Melbourne